Coalition Council of Islamic Revolution Forces is a conservative coalition of parties that endorsed a joint electoral list for 2020 Iranian legislative election. 

Reuters described the coalition as the "biggest hardline group" in the elections and "expected to dominate" the parliament.

The list includes Mohammad Bagher Ghalibaf on top of its list, and other candidates include former members of the Islamic Revolutionary Guard Corps and Basij, as well as other figures loyal to Ali Khamenei. The coalition failed to form an electoral pact with the far-right Front of Islamic Revolution Stability.

References

2019 establishments in Iran
Political party alliances in Iran
Principlist political groups in Iran
Electoral lists for Iranian legislative election, 2020